In enzymology, a S-methyl-5'-thioadenosine phosphorylase is an enzyme that catalyzes the chemical reaction

S-methyl-5'-thioadenosine + phosphate  adenine + S-methyl-5-thio-alpha-D-ribose 1-phosphate

Thus, the two substrates of this enzyme are S-methyl-5'-thioadenosine and phosphate, whereas its two products are adenine and S-methyl-5-thio-alpha-D-ribose 1-phosphate.

This enzyme belongs to the family of glycosyltransferases, specifically the pentosyltransferases.  The systematic name of this enzyme class is S-methyl-5-thioadenosine:phosphate S-methyl-5-thio-alpha-D-ribosyl-transferase. Other names in common use include 5'-methylthioadenosine nucleosidase, 5'-deoxy-5'-methylthioadenosine phosphorylase, MTA phosphorylase, MeSAdo phosphorylase, MeSAdo/Ado phosphorylase, methylthioadenosine phosphorylase, methylthioadenosine nucleoside phosphorylase, 5'-methylthioadenosine:phosphate methylthio-D-ribosyl-transferase, and S-methyl-5-thioadenosine phosphorylase.  This enzyme participates in methionine metabolism.

Structural studies

References

 
 
 

EC 2.4.2
Enzymes of known structure